OBD may refer to:

 On-board diagnostics, an electronics self diagnostic system, typically used in automotive applications
 Optimal biological dose, the quantity of a radiological or pharmacological treatment that will produce the desired effect with acceptable toxicity

See also
 OBD Memorial, a project by the Ministry of Defense of the Russian Federation